State Highway 257 (SH 257) is an  state highway in the Front Range in Weld County, Colorado, United States, that connects Colorado State Highway 60 (SH 60) in Milliken with Colorado State Highway 14 (SH 14) on the northestern corner of Severance.

Route description
SH 257 begins at a junction with SH 60 and County Road 21 in northwest of central Milliken, a town in central Weld County. It then heads northward, crosses the Big Thompson River, a tributary of the South Platte River then enters Greeley.

At Greeley, SH 257 has two interchanges: one with U.S. Route 34 (US 34) and one with U.S. Route 34 Business (US 34 Bus.). Both are diamond interchanges, but only the US 34 intersection has complete access.

SH 257 then heads northward, and begins to curve northwest over the Cache la Poudre River and into Windsor. It abruptly turns west and begins a concurrency with intersects Colorado State Highway 392 (SH 392) along Main Street. About  later, SH 257 turns back northward at 7th Street and ends its concurrency with SH 392. SH then heads north to SH 14, where it terminates on the town limits of northwestern Severance.

History
The route was established in 1939 with several differences. The route went north to Windsor from Milliken, then turning west to Colorado State Highway 185 (SH 185). SH 185 was then deleted and replaced with Interstate 25 (I‑25), and SH 257 was readjusted so that it went north to SH 14. The route was paved by 1954. A spur south of Windsor was eliminated a year later. The interchanges at US 24 and US 34 Bus. were built in 1998.

In November 2009, a new traffic signal was installed at the intersection with Garden Drive in Windsor. The construction cost about $350,000.

Future
Because of congestion around the US 34 and US 34 Bus. interchanges, a bus rapid transit system has been planned to be built in Greeley.

Major intersections

See also

 List of state highways in Colorado

References

External links

257
Transportation in Weld County, Colorado
Greeley, Colorado